The 1867 Melbourne Cup was a two-mile handicap horse race which took place on Thursday, 31 October 1867.

This year was the seventh running of the Melbourne Cup. Just like in 1866 the race saw two horses with the same name take part. Both horses were called Tim Whiffler. To avoid another mix up the horses where referred to as 'Melbourne Tim' and 'Sydney Tim'. 'Sydney Tim' was trained by Etienne De Mestre who trained Archer to win the first two Melbourne Cups. 'Sydney Tim' won the AJC Derby on route to a 2 length win as 5/2 favourite. 'Melbourne Tim' ran fifth while Exile the previous year's runner up finished third. The Tim Whiffler's who ran in this race are not to be confused with Tim Whiffler son of 'Sydeny Tim' who won the Great Northern Derby in New Zealand in 1881 nor an English sire also named Tim Whiffler who was brought to Australia and sired future cup winners Briseis and Darriwell. The winning time of 3:39.0 was at the time the fastest winning time in the race's history.

This is the list of placegetters for the 1867 Melbourne Cup.

See also

 Melbourne Cup
 List of Melbourne Cup winners
 Victoria Racing Club

References

External links
1867 Melbourne Cup footyjumpers.com

1867
Melbourne Cup
Melbourne Cup
19th century in Melbourne
1860s in Melbourne